Başpınar is a village in the Adıyaman District, Adıyaman Province, Turkey. Its population is 186 (2021).

The hamlet of Tilkicik is attached to the village.

References

Villages in Adıyaman District

Kurdish settlements in Adıyaman Province